are Korean traditional sandals made of straw. Koreans have worn straw sandals since ancient times. In the Joseon period,  were worn mostly by commoners, working farmers.

See also

References

External links

A Straw-and-Grass-Filled Journey of Reminiscence
Museum of Korean Straw and Plant Handicrafts
Jipsin (straw shoes)

Korean footwear
Sandals
Straw objects
Korean words and phrases